The Mercedes–Benz M276 engine is a direct injected, gasoline automotive piston V6 engine.

The M276 engine is not related to the Chrysler Pentastar except for the 60 degree angle, despite that it was developed while Chrysler was still owned by Daimler AG. This can be seen in its 60 degree vee–angle, as opposed to the 90 degree angle of its M272 predecessor. The 60 degree vee–angle eliminates the need for a balance shaft, improving refinement while reducing mechanical complexity. None of the parts are shared at all.

The M276 engine features an aluminum engine block with Nanoslide cylinder coating and dual overhead camshafts with independent variable valve timing on 12 intake and 12 exhaust valves and a new 2–stage timing chain arrangement. The M276 also includes direct injection with piezo–electrically controlled injectors for 2 to 3 sprays per intake stroke in normal operation, multi–spark ignition that creates up to 4 sparks per cycle, and the demand–controlled fuel pump, water pump, oil pump and alternator that reduce parasitic loads.

The first spray of fuel injection creates the base lean burn mixture in the intake cycle, while the later spray(s), up to 4 more times in combustion cycle in difficult conditions for a clean burn, control when and where the ignition starts and how the burn propagates in stratified charge fashion. In combination with a new smaller and more efficient Variable Valve Timing mechanism on all 4 camshafts, the precise combustion control allows a quicker and smoother re–start of the engine for the stop–start system.  This VVT can alter cam timing up to 40 crank degrees with a higher speed than before, and enables limiting the intake charge combined with a normal combustion stroke, thus making the operating process an Atkinson Cycle in partial throttle conditions for better fuel efficiency.  These features are also shared with Mercedes' M278 V8 engine, announced at the same time.

Mercedes–Benz claims that the new engine, in conjunction with the demand–controlled ancillaries and the stop–start system, can produce up to a 24% improvement in fuel economy while increasing power and torque over the M272. This efficiency improvement led to the various models with this engine being labeled with Blue Efficiency moniker.

Retaining most of the above characteristics, turbocharged smaller displacement DELA 30 variant was introduced in 2013 for C400 (W205) and subsequently offered on other models without the name Blue Efficiency.

In 2015, a higher boost and a slightly lower compression ratio (10.5:1) were used to create a DE30LA version for AMG models, and is used for many AMG and Mercedes–Benz vehicles since.

DE 35

S350, CLS350, ML350, E350, C350 and GLK350 models received this higher output version from 2011 to 2015. S400h hybrid model used this engine from 2012 to 2017 in combination with an electric motor in between the engine and torque converter.

Applications 
 2011–2013 W221 S 350/S 350 4MATIC
 2011–2014 W212 E 300 BlueEFFICIENCY/E 300 BlueEFFICIENCY 4MATIC
 2011–2014 W218 CLS 350 BlueEFFICIENCY
 2011–2014 W204 C 350 / C 350 4MATIC
 2011–2014 W204 C 350 BlueEFFICIENCY / C 350 BlueEFFICIENCY 4MATIC
 2012–2014 W204 C 300 4MATIC (US/Canada)
 2012–2016 W212 E 350 BlueEFFICIENCY / E 350 BlueEFFICIENCY 4MATIC
 2012–2016 W212 E 400 HYBRID
 2012–2015 W166 ML 350 BlueEFFICIENCY 4MATIC
 2012–2015 X204 GLK 350 4MATIC BlueEfficiency
 2013–2015 X204 GLK 350
 2012 W251 R 350
 2013–2017 W222 S 400 HYBRID
 2011–2015 R172 SLK 350 BlueEFFICIENCY

DE 30 LA
This engine was introduced on 2014 C400(W205), and used for E400 Coupe 4Matic, ML(GLE)400 4Matic, E450 4Matic, CLS450, S450, S500e and other models.

This engine powers 2017–on AMG SLC43, AMG C43 and AMG GLE43, as well as 2018–2020 E450 4Matic, S560e and other models.

Applications 
 2013–2014 W212 E 400/E 400 4MATIC
 2014–2020 W222 S 320 (China)
 2014–2019 X166 GL 450 / GLS 450
 2014–2017 W222 S 500 PLUG–IN HYBRID
 2014–2015 W218 CLS 400/CLS 400 4MATIC
 2015–2019 W166 AMG GLE 43 4MATIC
 2015–2021 W205 C 400 4MATIC
 2015–present X253 AMG GLC 43 4MATIC
 2015–2017 W205 C 450 AMG 4MATIC
 2015–2017 W166 ML 400 / GLE 400 4MATIC
 2016–present BAIC BJ90 (an SUV from Chinese brand BAIC based on the second generation Mercedes-Benz GL-Class)
 2016–2017 W166 GLE 450 AMG 4MATIC
 2016–2018 W166 GLE 500 e / GLE 550 e (US) 4MATIC
 2016–2021 W205 AMG C 43 4MATIC
 2016–2018 W213 E 400 4MATIC
 2016–2018 W213 AMG E 43 4MATIC
 2018–2020 W222 S 580 e
 2019–2020 W213 E 450 4MATIC

DE 35 LA
The same bore and stroke of the normally aspirated DE 35 are used for this turbocharged version, with a lower boost level than the DE 30 LA on the same twin turbocharged format using a different model IHI turbocharger. While the power and torque remained the same, this larger displacement lower boost model yields a lower fuel consumption than the M276 DE 30 LA.
Sometimes called DE 35 LA, this engine was offered on S400, CLS400, E400 4Matic (up to 2018) and Maybach S400 4Matic models up to 2017.

Applications 
 2015–2017 W222 S 400 4MATIC
 2015–2016 W212 E 400/E 400 4MATIC
 2015–2017 C218 CLS 400/CLS 400 4MATIC
 2017–2018 W213 E 400 4MATIC
 2015–2017 W222 Maybach S 400 4MATIC

References

M276
V6 engines
Gasoline engines by model